This is a list of diplomatic missions of Madagascar, excluding honorary consulates. Madagascar is beginning to expand its diplomatic presence abroad.

Current missions

Africa

Americas

Asia

Europe

Multilateral organizations

Gallery

Closed missions

Africa

See also
 Foreign relations of Madagascar
 List of diplomatic missions in Madagascar
 Visa policy of Madagascar

References

Ministry of Foreign Affairs of Madagascar (French)

 
Diplomatic missions
Madagascar